Kadir Has Sport Hall is an indoor sporting arena that is located in Kayseri, Turkey. Together with Kayseri Kadir Has Stadium, it is a part of the Kayseri Kadir Has Sports Complex, one of the newest sports complexes in Turkey. Completed in 2008, the capacity of the arena is 7,200 spectators.

History
Upon the withdrawal of the Antalya Arena project, the venue was appointed to be one of the five basketball halls selected for the 2010 FIBA World Championship. The arena had a crucial role in Turkey's organization of the 2010 FIBA World Championship.

See also
Kadir Has Stadium

References

External links
Venue information
FIBA - FIBA ends inspection tour in Turkey for 2010 FIBA World Championship

Buildings and structures in Kayseri
Indoor arenas in Turkey
Sport in Kayseri
Basketball venues in Turkey
Sports venues completed in 2008